Victrix umovii is a moth of the family Noctuidae. It is found from Fennoscandia south to Poland, Ukraine and Moldova and east to Russia.

The wingspan is 29–31 mm.

The larvae feed on Alectoria sarmentosa.

References

Acronictinae
Moths of Europe
Moths described in 1846